Tarran Mackenzie (born 29 October 1995, often known as Taz) is a professional road racer of solo motorcycles, based in Ashby-de-la-Zouch, Leicestershire, England. For 2023, he will contest the World Supersport Championship for Japan-based MIE Honda run by Midori Moriwaki.

Mackenzie won the 2021 British Superbike Championship at the final round in October 2021. With an ambition to eventually compete at world superbike level, no full-season opportunities were available for 2022.

Mackenzie's British Superbike 2022 racing season started at the third event at Donington Park in mid-May, after missing the Silverstone and Oulton Park rounds with injury. Riding only partially recovered at Donington, he rode conservatively for points, finishing the  races in tenth, sixth and eleventh, further hindered by arm pump for the first time in his career, due to excessive arm use when steering, to compensate for his inability to switch-direction using leg pressure on the footrests. 

Mackenzie's 2022 BSB season ended on 25 September with a crash at Oulton Park, when he fell at the chicane and slid across the track under an oncoming motorcycle, breaking his left femur.

Nationality

Together with his brother, Taylor Mackenzie, also a motorcycle road racer until retiring in late 2021, they are the sons of Niall Mackenzie, a former motorcycle road racer. All three were born in the Stirling area of Scotland. Writing in 2017, Steve Day's feature was headed "MotoGP™ commentator Steve Day looks at the Scotsman ahead of his Moto2™ debut", and, as of 2021, the local newspaper was still referring to "...Stirling's Tarran".

Racing background
Mackenzie started racing in 2012, competed in the Monster Energy Motostar Championship during 2013, and was the 2016 British Supersport 600 Champion. He entered the Moto2 world championship in 2017 as a replacement for Danny Kent, scoring one championship point from a best finish of 15th, achieving 37th overall.

British Superbikes
Mackenzie has been active in BSB since the 2018 British Superbike Championship season, winning the series in 2021.

2022 World Superbikes
Mackenzie continued in British Superbikes, but received an offer of a factory world superbike Yamaha machine for potentially three wildcard events, at Assen, Donington Park, and a third unconfirmed circuit, during 2022. He sustained a leg injury in BSB early-season practice and could not participate in the  scheduled wildcard entry at Assen.

After missing Assen, Netherlands in April, at the Donington Park event with three wildcard races in July 2022, Mackenzie placed 14th, and then 15th in the last race after crashing into Xavi Vierge in the sprint race in between, resulting in a DNF. Mackenzie received a five-place grid penalty for the third race-start.

Career Statistics

Grand Prix motorcycle racing

By season

Races by year
(key)

British Superbike Championship

Races by Year 

 * Season still in progress

Superbike World Championship

By season

Races by year
(key) (Races in bold indicate pole position) (Races in italics indicate fastest lap)

* Season still in progress.

Supersport World Championship

By season

Races by year
(key) (Races in bold indicate pole position, races in italics indicate fastest lap)

 Season still in progress.

References

External links

At home with the Mackenzies BikeSocial at Bennetts

1995 births
Living people
British motorcycle racers
125cc World Championship riders
British Superbike Championship riders
Moto2 World Championship riders
Sportspeople from Stirling
Superbike World Championship riders
Supersport World Championship riders